Assam Combined Entrance Examination (অসম সংযুক্ত প্ৰৱেশ পৰীক্ষা or the Assam-CEE) is a state-government controlled centralized entrance examination, conducted by the Assam Science and Technology University for admission into the 7 premier government engineering colleges in Assam. The test is taken after the 12th grade for admission to graduation (also known as Bachelors) courses. The exam can be taken by those who studied Pure Science stream in plus two level with the specific subjects tested in the examination, which are Physics, Chemistry, Mathematics. Every year approximately 25,000 people take the examination, and it is increasing. Students of both Assam Higher Secondary Education Council and the Central Board of Secondary Education board take the test. Formerly the examination was conducted by Dibrugarh University and since 2018 it is conducted by Assam Science & Technology University.

It is a highly competitive test having selection ratio of approximately around 5.6%.

Eligibility criteria
To appear in the Assam CEE exam, applicants are must to meet with following eligibility criteria:
Candidates must possess a domicile of Assam state.
Applicant’s age must be in between 17 and 21 years as on August of that year. Three years of relaxation in age is specified for reserved category applicants and one year for graduate applicants.
Upper age limit is relaxed to 22 years in case of B.Sc. passed Candidates. Upper age limit  is relaxed by 3 years for Scheduled Cast and Scheduled Tribe candidates.
 For admission into B.E./B.Tech Courses the candidate must pass the Qualifying Examination individually in the same sitting without any grace marks in the subject of Physics, Chemistry, Mathematics and English with a minimum of 50  % (45 % in case of SC and 40 % in case of ST) marks taken together in Physics, Chemistry and Mathematics. The same sitting means a candidate must appear all the four subjects i.e. Physics, Chemistry, Mathematics and English together.
The Candidate must possess a good moral character. 
The Candidate must be physically and mentally fit.

Exam pattern
The examination pattern was changed from the year 2017 onwards. The new pattern is given below:
Number of questions: 120
Maximum marks: 480
Question type: objective
Duration: 3 hours
Marking Scheme: +4 for correct response and -1 for incorrect response.

The examination have multiple choice questions and consist of single paper and take three hours. Questions will be distributed as follows:

Mathematics: 40 Questions 
Physics: 40 Questions
Chemistry: 40 Questions

Four marks will be awarded for every right answer and one will be deducted for every wrong answer.  No mark will be awarded if the candidate selects more than one option. Therefore, the maximum mark is 480 and the minimum is -120. Once marked, an answer cannot be changed.

Participating Institutes
Participating public colleges under the State government are listed below:
Assam Engineering College (420 seats for B.Tech course)
Jorhat Engineering College (315 seats for B.Tech course)
Jorhat Institute of Science & Technology (240 seats for B.Tech course)
Bineswar Brahma Engineering College (240 seats for B.Tech course)
Barak Valley Engineering College (240 seats for B.Tech course)
Dhemaji Engineering College (180 seats for B.Tech course)
Golaghat Engineering College, (180 seats for B.Tech course)
Institute of Science and Technology, Gauhati University, Guwahati
With permission from Director of Technical Education (DTE), Government of Assam, other Private Institutions may also be allowed to participate in the counselling process. Some of the institute/college are listed below:
Girijananda Chowdhury Institute of Management and Technology, Tezpur
Scholar's Institute of Technology & Management, Guwahati
NETES Institute of Technology and Science Mirza
Don Bosco College Of Engineering & Technology, Guwahati
Royal School of Engineering & Technology, Guwahati
Assam Down Town University, Guwahati
School of Engineering and Technology, Kaziranga University, Jorhat

Exam centers
Silchar
Bongaigaon
Nalbari
Lakhimpur
Guwahati
Tezpur
Nagaon
Jorhat
Dibrugarh

References

External links
 Assam Science and Technology University homepage
 Assam-CEE website
 Assam Govt Direct Recruitment
 Assam Direct Recruitment Syllabus
 Assam Career
 Assam Career Job 2023

Standardised tests in India
Education in Assam
Engineering entrance examinations in India
Year of establishment missing